Kondrashyovka is a rural locality (a selo) in Stadnitskoye Rural Settlement, Semiluksky District, Voronezh Oblast, Russia. The population was 229 as of 2010. There are 12 streets.

Geography 
Kondrashyovka is located 40 km northwest of Semiluki (the district's administrative centre) by road. Stadnitsa is the nearest rural locality.

References 

Rural localities in Semiluksky District